The Wilderness Years may refer to:

Winston Churchill: The Wilderness Years, 1981 drama serial based on the life of Winston Churchill
The Wilderness Years (Nick Lowe album), an album by Nick Lowe
Adrian Mole: The Wilderness Years, the fourth book in the Adrian Mole series, written by Sue Townsend